Claire Bouchet (born 9 January 1954) is a French politician of the Radical Movement who served as Member of Parliament for Hautes-Alpes's 2nd constituency from 2020 to 2022.

Early life 
Bouchet was born in Gap, Hautes-Alpes.

Political career 
She was mayor of La Motte-en-Champsaur from 2001 to 2014.

In the 2017 French legislative election, she was substitute candidate. She replaced Joël Giraud in the National Assembly when he was appointed to government.

She did not seek re-election in the 2022 French legislative election.

References 

Living people
1954 births
People from Gap, Hautes-Alpes
Radical Party of the Left politicians
Politicians from Provence-Alpes-Côte d'Azur
Deputies of the 15th National Assembly of the French Fifth Republic
21st-century French women politicians
Women members of the National Assembly (France)
20th-century French civil servants
Women mayors of places in France
La République En Marche! politicians